Acraea igola, the dusky-veined acraea, is a butterfly of the family Nymphalidae. It is found from the Eastern Cape along the coast to KwaZulu-Natal, Zimbabwe, Mozambique, north-eastern Tanzania.

The wingspan is 40–45 mm for males and 45–53 mm for females. Adults are on wing year round, with a peak from October to April. It is very scarce in dry months.

Description

A. igola Trim, is very similar to the two preceding species, [ A. quirinalis , A. orestia ]  but the marginal band of the hindwing 
is not transparent and the cell is unspotted. Basal half of the forewing as far as the apex of the cell and vein 3 bright orange-yellow without spots; costal margin dusted with black to the base, apex, marginal band and veins 3-6; cellules 3-6 otherwise diaphanous; hindwing orange-yellow above with black dots and black marginal band 2-2.5 mm. in breadth; the red-yellow colour on the under surface much paler than on the upper; streaks on the interneural folds short, not reaching the distal margin. In the female the ground-colour is lighter, light ochre-yellow to cream-yellow and the marginal band not sharply defined. Zululand to German East 
Africa. - female f. maculiventris Sm. & Kirby has a duller, more brown-yellow ground-colour and the marginal band on the upperside of the hindwing not sharply defined, sometimes broader, sometimes narrower; beneath the hindwing is sometimes coloured as above, sometimes chocolate-brown at the base as far as the discal spots, and then light reddish to the red-brown marginal band. Among the type-form.

Biology
The larvae feed on Urera woodii and Urera trinervis.

Taxonomy
It is a member of the Acraea masamba species group -  but see also Pierre & Bernaud, 2014

References

External links

Images representing Acraea igola at Bold.

igola
Butterflies described in 1889
Butterflies of Africa
Taxa named by Roland Trimen